NIC may refer to:

Banking and insurance companies 
 National Insurance Corporation, Uganda
 NIC Bank, a commercial bank in Kenya

Politics, government and economics 
 National Ice Center, an agency that provides worldwide navigational ice analyses for the United States military and government 
 National Incubation Center, Ignite - National Technology Fund, Ministry of IT & Telecom, Government of Pakistan
 National Iranian Congress, a political organization founded in U.S.-based for a free and democratic Iranian
 Natal Indian Congress, a political party in South Africa formed by Mohandas Karamchand Gandhi
 National Implementation Committee on FATA Reforms, a committee chaired by the Prime Minister of Pakistan regarding the Federally Administered Tribal Areas
 National Indigenous Council, an advisory body to the Australian Government from late 2004 to early 2008
 National Informatics Centre, Government of India
 National Infrastructure Commission, a UK government body advising on large-scale infrastructure projects
 National Institute of Corrections, a division of the United States Department of Justice
 National Insurance Contributions, UK contributions towards state benefits
 National Integration Council of India, to combat the problems of Communalism, casteism and Regionalism
 National Intelligence Council, center for midterm and long-term strategic thinking within the United States intelligence community
 National Irrigation Commission, Jamaica agricultural irrigation government commission
 Newly industrialized country, a socio-economic classification status used by political scientists
 Nicaragua, the ISO 3166-1 three-letter country code
 NIC Argentina, Network Information Center, an office of Argentina's Ministry of Foreign Affairs
 Niger–Congo languages, the ISO 639-2 three-letter language code
 NIC Inc. (eGov.com), an information service provider for federal and state government in the United States

Technology 
 Negative impedance converter, configuration of an operational amplifier which acts as a negative load
 Network information center, formerly InterNIC, part of the Internet's Domain Name System (DNS)
 Network interface controller, electronic hardware that enables a computer to communicate over a computer network
 New Internet Computer, former inexpensive Linux-based network computer

Science and medicine 
 A brand name for the drug lorazepam
 Nomarski interference contrast, a technique in microscopy

Other topics 
 "NIC", a song by Nines (rapper)
 National identity card (Sri Lanka), an identity document in Sri Lanka
 Nagoya International Center, a non-profit organization based in Nakamura-ku, Nagoya, Japan
 National Ice Centre, an ice and music arena in Nottingham, England
 New In Chess, a chess magazine issued eight times a year
 NIC Zuidlaren, an international horse riding competition in Zuidlaren, Netherlands
 The IATA airport code for Nicosia International Airport, an abandoned airport near Nicosia in Cyprus
 North Idaho College, a community college located in Coeur d'Alene, Idaho
 North Island College, a community college complex on the northern half of Vancouver Island, Canada
 North American Interfraternity Conference, an association of collegiate men's fraternities formally organized in 1910
 Nursing Interventions Classification, a classification system for nursing

See also 
 Nic, a given name
 Nick (disambiguation)
 Nix (disambiguation)